Between the Ears is a programme on BBC Radio 3 that airs brief documentary features in experimental formats. A season of Between the Ears programmes is produced roughly twice a year, and when the programmes are in season they are broadcast late on Saturday nights, UK time.

References

External links 

 Guardian review of a Between The Ears episode

BBC Radio 3 programmes